The 1993 All-Pacific-10 Conference football team consists of American football players chosen by various organizations for All-Pac-12 Conference teams for the 1993 Pacific-10 Conference football season. The UCLA Bruins, Arizona Wildcats, and USC Trojans could all claim a conference championship, posting 6–2 conference records. UCLA wide receiver J. J. Stokes was voted Pac-10 Offensive Player of the Year. Arizona defensive tackle Rob Waldrop was voted Pac-10 Defensive Player of the Year.

Offensive selections

Quarterbacks
Rob Johnson, USC (Coaches-1)

Running backs
 Napoleon Kaufman , Washington (Coaches-1)
Mario Bates, Arizona St. (Coaches-1)

Wide receivers
 Johnnie Morton, USC (Coaches-1)
 J. J. Stokes , UCLA (Coaches-1)

Tight ends
 Mark Bruener, Washington (Coaches-1)

Tackles
Todd Steussie, California (Coaches-1)
Vaughn Parker, UCLA (Coaches-1)

Guards
Eric Mahlum, California (Coaches-1)
Craig Novitsky, UCLA (Coaches-1)

Centers
Tom Gallagher, Washington (Coaches-1)

Defensive selections

Ends
Tedy Bruschi, Arizona (Coaches-1)
Willie McGinest, USC (Coaches-1)  
DeWayne Patterson, Washington St. (Coaches-1)

Tackles
Rob Waldrop, Arizona (Coaches-1)

Linebackers
Jamir Miller, UCLA (Coaches-1)
Jerrott Willard, California (Coaches-1)
Anthony McClanahan, Washington St. (Coaches-1)
Sean Harris, Arizona (Coaches-1)

Defensive backs
Marvin Goodwin, UCLA (Coaches-1)
Tony Bouie, Arizona (Coaches-1)
Eric Zomalt, California (Coaches-1)
Craig Newsome, Arizona St. (Coaches-1)

Special teams

Placekickers
 Bjorn Merten, UCLA (Coaches-1)

Punters
 Darren Schager, UCLA (Coaches-1)

Return specialists/All purpose 
Chuck Levy, Arizona (Coaches-1)
Deron Pointer, Washington St. (Coaches-1)

Key
Coaches = selected by the conference coaches

See also
1993 College Football All-America Team

References

All-Pacific-10 Conference Football Team
All-Pac-12 Conference football teams